Renzo Sánchez (born 17 February 2004) is a Uruguayan professional footballer who plays as a forward for Nacional.

Early life 
Born in Rocha, Renzo Sánchez first played with local club  before joining the Club Nacional de Football ahead of the 2020 season, as he was also scouted by Argentine club River Plate.

Club career 
Sánchez made his first team debut during the 2022 pre-season friendlies, before signing his first contract with Club Nacional.

Having fully moved to the first team during the summer, Sánchez made his professional debut for Nacional on 22 September 2022, coming on as a second half substitute for Santiago Ramírez in the 3–0 Copa Uruguay away defeat to Rampla Juniors.

International career 
In September 2022, Sánchez was called up to the Uruguay under-20 team for the first time, to take part in the South American Games.

On 3 January 2023, he was called up by Marcelo Broli for the South American Under-20 Championship, which his team finished second.

Style of play 
Coming through the Palermo academy as a central midfielder, Sánchez later developed himself as a more offensive potential by playing as a winger on both flanks, as an attacking midfielder or even a striker.

Honours

Club
Nacional
Uruguayan Primera División: 2022

International 
Uruguay
South American U-20 Championship Runner-up: 2023

References

External links

2004 births
Living people
Uruguayan footballers
Uruguay youth international footballers
Association football forwards
People from Rocha, Uruguay
Club Nacional de Football players
Uruguayan Primera División players